Actinoplanes xinjiangensis is a Gram-positive and antibiotic-resistant bacterium from the genus Actinoplanes which has been isolated from the Xinjiang Uyghur Autonomous Region, China.

References

External links
Type strain of Actinoplanes xinjiangensis at BacDive -  the Bacterial Diversity Metadatabase

Micromonosporaceae
Bacteria described in 2009